John B. Paolella (born February 14, 1949) is an American Republican Party politician who served in both houses of the New Jersey Legislature from the 38th district– one term in the New Jersey General Assembly and one term in the New Jersey Senate.

Born in Hackensack on February 14, 1949, Paolella attended Bergen Catholic High School and graduated from Harvard University in 1971. He received a J.D. degree from Seton Hall University School of Law and was admitted to the New Jersey Bar in 1976. He served as a legal advisor to then-Assemblyman W. Cary Edwards.

In his first bid for the Legislature, Paolella and Republican running mate Louis F. Kosco defeated incumbent Democratic Assemblymen Robert Burns and Paul Contillo. After serving one term there, Paolella ran for the Senate in 1981 and defeated incumbent John Skevin. Paolella served a two-year term in the Senate before being defeated for reelection in 1983 by Contillo who went on to serve for eight more years in the Senate and a second brief stint in the Assembly in 2013.

Paolella later moved to Bay Head and got involved in local politics there. In 2014, running on a Republican ticket with fellow Bergen County transplant Steve Lonegan, he ran for a seat on the Ocean County Board of Chosen Freeholders seeking to defeat long-time incumbent Freeholder Joseph H. Vicari. Vicari ultimately defeated Paolella nearly 76%–24%.

References

1949 births
Living people
Bergen Catholic High School alumni
Harvard University alumni
Seton Hall University School of Law alumni
Politicians from Hackensack, New Jersey
Politicians from Monmouth County, New Jersey
People from Bay Head, New Jersey
New Jersey lawyers
Republican Party members of the New Jersey General Assembly
Republican Party New Jersey state senators